K246 or K-246 may refer to:

K-246 (Kansas highway), a state highway in Kansas
HMS Spey (K246), a former UK Royal Navy ship
K246CI, a radio station
K.246 Piano Concerto No. 8 (Mozart) in C major, "Lützow" (1776)